Bitarap Turkmenistan Avenue is the main avenue and one of the largest roads of Ashgabat. Bitarap Turkmenistan is historically called Podvoiskogo Street. In 2011, it was reconstructed by the Turkish company Polimeks. Prospect originates from the Neutrality Monument. White marble houses, modern supermarkets, office buildings, and infrastructure were built along the avenue. Prospect intersects Chandybil highway, Archabil highway and 10 ýyl Aabadnçylyk street.

Characteristics 

The road is 30 meters in width and consists of 8 lanes, with each direction of traffic comprising four lanes. The avenue has a side walk, bouquets dividing strip, and ancillary roads. The roadway curbs and sidewalks are paved with granite. Bus stops with air-conditioned rooms, a kiosk and a telephone booths furnished in Turkmen style are present throughout the tracks. Trees and shrubs have been planted along the avenue. The street is well equipped with a traffic light LED system along with several overhead and underground passages.

Notable buildings and structures 
 Neutrality Monument
 State Association "Turkmenatlary"
 Oguzkent Hotel
 Ministry of Culture of Turkmenistan
 Dayhanbank
 Central Bank of Turkmenistan
 Turkmen State News Service

References

External links 
 Neutrality Avenue

Streets in Ashgabat